Events in the year 2016 in Chile.

Incumbents
 President: Michelle Bachelet

Sport
 Chile at the 2016 Summer Olympics
 2015–16 Chilean Primera División season
 2016 Americas Rugby Championship

Events 

 25 December: 2016 Chiloé earthquake

References 

 
Years of the 21st century in Chile
2010s in Chile
Chile
Chile